Datuk Hisham Hamdan (Jawi: هشام همدان) is the executive director of Khazanah Nasional and also the director and chairman of UDA Holdings Berhad from Malaysia since 2019.

On 28 February 2020, he was tested positive for COVID-19, making him the 26th case for Malaysia. He also issued a statement on 6 March 2020, denying the claim that he was the cause of the new clusters in increasing cases in Malaysia.

References

Living people
Malaysian Muslims
Malaysian people of Malay descent
Year of birth missing (living people)